Halomonas organivorans is a halophile able to degrade aromatic compounds. It's considered a potentially useful bacteria for decontamination of polluted saline habitats. Its type strain is G-16.1T (=CECT 5995T =CCM 7142T).

References

Further reading

External links

LPSN
Type strain of Halomonas organivorans at BacDive -  the Bacterial Diversity Metadatabase

Oceanospirillales
Bacteria described in 2004